The 1971 SANFL Grand Final was an Australian rules football competition. North Adelaide beat Port Adelaide by 79 to 59.

Teams

References 

SANFL Grand Finals
SANFL Grand Final, 1971